Keana Lyn Bastidas (born March 18, 1998 in Toronto, Ontario), sometimes credited as Keana Bastidas or Keana Lyn, is a Canadian actress. She is most noted for her performances as Suzi in The Yard, and as Callie Shaw in the 2020 series The Hardy Boys. 

For her work on The Yard, she received a Canadian Screen Award nomination for Best Supporting Actress in a Comedy Series at the 1st Canadian Screen Awards in 2013.

Filmography

FIlm

Television

References

External links

1998 births
Actresses from Toronto
Canadian television actresses
Canadian film actresses
Living people
21st-century Canadian actresses